Henrique Afonso Gomes (born 23 March 1991) is a Portuguese footballer who plays for Oriental as a forward.

Football career
On 20 August 2014, Gomes made his professional debut with Oriental in a 2014–15 Taça da Liga match against Olhanense.

References

External links

Stats and profile at LPFP 

1991 births
People from Seixal
Living people
Portuguese footballers
Association football forwards
Clube Oriental de Lisboa players
Liga Portugal 2 players
Sportspeople from Setúbal District